Timacum Minus (also known as ) is archeological site located in Ravna, Serbia. Site was declared Monument of Culture of Great Importance in 1979, and it is protected by Republic of Serbia. Timacum Minus is the oldest military fort in the Timok Valley, eastern Serbia.

Geography 
Timacum Minus and its counterpart Timacum Maius (near Svrljig) are located in the Timok river valley. The area is surrounded by a hilly landscape with many mountain ranges which traverse the region. The location of Timacum Minus was on the Roman route Lissus-Naissus-Ratiaria. Trade routes from the Balkans coalesced in the Naissus  region. Timacum Minus is located 60 km northeast of Naissus.

History 
Timacum Minus was a strategic location for the Romans Empire. The region of Naissus was the center of the trade network from the north-south and west-east axis in the Balkans. In the areas near Naissus extensive mining activity was promoted by the Roman administration which necessitated the establishment of permanents forts, road networks and administrative facilities. Legio V Macedonica and IV Scythica, followed by a small auxiliary force from cohors I Thracum Syriaca. The road network began to develop and other military camps were built in this early period: Timacum Mais (Niševac), Timacum Minus (Ravna) and Combustica (Kladorub). During the reign of Marcus Aurelius, cohors I Thracum Syriaca was replaced with the newly founded cohors II Aurelia Dardanorum, formed by the local population of the province of Moesia Superior. In this period, latrones Dardaniae (Dardanian brigants) were active in the area of Timacum Minus. The deployment of c. II Aurelia Dardanorum marks the building of the first permanent military base in Timacum Minus, around which the urban settlement developed. Permanent military deployment coincided with mining development and large-scale road construction.

The archeological site is located SE from a small village of  Ravna, north from Knjaževac, near White Timok River. Fortress and nearby village was dated in 1st century AD, and last up until Justinian's restoration of the empire in 6th century. Only few kilometers away from the fortress, on the slope of the Slog hill, two Roman necropolis were found, with numerous findings and burial gifts (jewelry, ceramic and glass vessels, money, etc.). Archeological findings from this site are mostly presented in the County Museum of Knjaževac and as well in the archeo-ethno park on site, where Lapidarium is formed.

Gallery

See also 
 Monuments of Culture of Great Importance
 Tourism in Serbia

References

Sources

Further reading

External links 

 Timacum Minus - Ravna (English)
 Timacum Minus (Ravna) Römisches und frühbyzantinisches Castrum und Siedlung (German)
 Serbia Travel - Timacum Minus
 www.Wikimapia.org - Ravna, Timacum Minus

Moesia
Moesia Superior
Roman sites in Serbia
Archaeological Sites of Great Importance (Serbia)
Former populated places in Serbia
Late Roman military